John & Jehn (also known as John and Jehn) are a lo-fi/indie rock duo from France, in which John and Jehn are respectively Nicolas Congé (aka Johnny Hostile) and Camille Berthomier (aka Jehnny Beth).

History 
John & Jehn started their musical career when the couple moved from their hometowns to London at the end of 2006. The first song they wrote together was "20 L 07". Their influences included Serge Gainsbourg, the Velvet Underground, Jean-Luc Godard, Gang of Four, John Fante, Joy Division, Jacques Brel and Johnny Cash. They released their debut album, nearly all of which was recorded in their bedroom, on indie label Faculty Music Media in April 2008, to critical acclaim.

After touring Europe, the pair returned to Angoulême in the summer of 2009 to build and record in their own studio, and to rehearse for their initial live shows as a quartet (supporting Franz Ferdinand in front of 8,000 people in Paris was their first). Their second studio album, Time for the Devil, was released on March 28, 2010. To support their second album on stage, John & Jehn were joined by Raphael Mura (from Underground Railroad) on drums and Maud-Elisa Mandeau (from Le Prince Miiaou) on guitar. For their UK tour, Gemma Thompson (from Hindley) was added on guitar.

In 2010, John & Jehn settled back in London. They toured Europe and appeared on the front cover of Artrocker magazine.

Other projects
In 2005, Berthomier played the leading role in À travers la forêt. She also appeared as an actress in the 2009 film Sodium Babies.

In 2011, they created their own Pop Noire label, which aimed to release their new records and other artists produced by John in the John & Jehn studio in London. The first release, by the artist Lescop, was the track "La Foret" (produced by John and video by Jehn), issued in October 2011.

In October 2011, Berthomier (using her pseudonym Jehnny Beth) and Thompson formed the London-based post-punk band, Savages. Congé acts as Savages' producer.

Members
 Nicolas Congé - vocals, guitars
 Camille Berthomier - vocals, guitars, bass, keyboards

Touring members
 Gemma Thompson - backing vocals, guitars, keyboards
 Niall 'Liquid K' Kavanagh - drums

Discography

Studio albums

Singles

References

External links 
 Official website http://makeyourmumbeproud.blogspot.com/
 Myspace http://www.myspace.com/johnjehn
 Interview with John & Jehn on www.4ortherecord.com

French rock music groups
Musical groups established in 2006
2006 establishments in France
Naïve Records artists